This is a list of Ohio Bobcats men's basketball head coaches

Source: Ohio Basketball Media Guide

References

Ohio

Ohio Bobcats basketball, men's, coaches